The Tomb of the Unknown Soldier is a monument in Warsaw, Poland, dedicated to the unknown soldiers who have given their lives for Poland. It is one of many such national tombs of unknowns that were erected after World War I, and the most important such monument in Poland.

The monument, located at Piłsudski Square, is the only surviving part of the Saxon Palace that occupied the spot until World War II. Since 2 November 1925 the tomb houses the unidentified body of a young soldier who fell during the Defence of Lwów. Since then, earth from numerous battlefields where Polish soldiers have fought has been added to the urns housed in the surviving pillars of the Saxon Palace.

The Tomb is constantly lit by an eternal flame and assisted by a guard post provided by the three companies of the 1st Guards Battalion, Representative Honor Guard Regiment of the Polish Armed Forces. It is there that most official military commemorations take place in Poland and where foreign representatives lay wreaths when visiting Poland.

The changing of the guard takes place every full hour, 365 days a year.

History

In 1923, a group of unknown Varsovians placed, before Warsaw's Saxon Palace and the adjacent Saxon Garden, a stone tablet commemorating all the unknown Polish soldiers who had fallen in World War I and the subsequent Polish-Soviet War. This initiative was taken up by several Warsaw newspapers and by General Władysław Sikorski. On April 4, 1925, the Polish Ministry of War selected a battlefield from which the ashes of an unknown soldier would be brought to Warsaw. Of some 40 battles, that for Lwów was chosen. In October 1925, at Lwów's Cemetery of the Defenders of Lwów, three coffins were exhumed: those of an unknown sergeant, corporal, and private. The coffin that was to be transported to Warsaw was chosen by Jadwiga Zarugiewiczowa, mother of a soldier who had fallen at Zadwórze and whose body had never been found.

On November 2, 1925, the coffin was brought to Warsaw's St. John's Cathedral, where a Mass was held. Afterward eight recipients of the order of Virtuti Militari bore the coffin to its final resting place beneath the colonnade joining the two wings of the Saxon Palace. The coffin was buried along with 14 urns containing soil from as many battlegrounds, a Virtuti Militari medal, and a memorial tablet. Since then, except under German occupation during World War II, an honor guard has continuously been held before the Tomb.

Architecture
The Tomb was designed by the famous Polish sculptor, Stanisław Kazimierz Ostrowski. It was located within the arcade that linked the two symmetrical wings of the Saxon Palace, then the seat of the Polish Ministry of War. The central tablet was ringed by 5 eternal flames and 4 stone tablets bearing the names and dates of battles in which Polish soldiers had fought during World War I and the Polish–Soviet War (1919–21). Behind the Tomb were two steel gratings bearing emblems of Poland's two highest Polish military decorations — the Virtuti Militari and Cross of Valor.

During the 1939 invasion of Poland, the building was slightly damaged by German aerial bombing, but it was quickly rebuilt and seized by the German authorities. After the Warsaw Uprising, in December 1944, the palace was completely demolished by the Wehrmacht. Only part of the central colonnade, sheltering the Tomb, was preserved. Although German sappers were ordered to demolish the entire palace they refused to demolish the section that housed the tomb and its memorial. The original damaged walls either side of the present building are still in evidence.

After the war, in late 1945, reconstruction began. Only a small part of the palace, containing the Tomb, was restored by Henryk Grunwald. On 8 May 1946 it was opened to the public. Soil from 24 additional battlegrounds was added to the urns, as well as more tablets with names of battles in which Poles had fought in World War II. However, the communist authorities erased all trace of the Polish–Soviet War of 1920, and only a few of the Polish Armed Forces' battles in the West were included. This was corrected in 1990, after Poland had regained its political autonomy.

In August 2022 ground works started on rebuilding the Saxon Palace, after the Polish Government announced a plan for reconstruction. It is expected to be completed by 2030.

Battles currently featured on the stone tablets

Gallery

References

External links
 Treasures of Warsaw on-line
  The Tomb in 1939 and nowadays
  History of the Tomb
  VIRTUAL TOUR

Buildings and structures in Warsaw
Eternal flames
Military memorials and cemeteries in Poland
!Tomb of the Unknown Soldier

Monuments and memorials in Warsaw
Tombs of Unknown Soldiers
1925 establishments in Poland